Blochius is an extinct genus of prehistoric fish from the Eocene. It is the only genus of the family Blochiidae. It was described by Giovanni Serafino Volta (1764-1842) in 1800.

Description
Blochius was about 60 cm long and had a very slender elongated body, a narrow head with elongated upper and lower jaws and large eyes.

Species 
 Blochius longirostris Volta, 1796 
 Blochius macropterus de Zigno, 1887 
 Blochius moorheadi Eastman, 1911 (nomen dubium)

References
Blochius, Paleobiology Database
 Harry L. Fierstine: Fossil History of Billfishes (Xiphioidei). Bulletin of Marine Science, Volume 79, Issue 3, Januar 2006, Seiten 433-453 Abstract 
 Karl Albert Frickhinger: Fossilien Atlas Fische, Mergus-Verlag, Melle, 1999, 

Acanthomorpha
Eocene fish
Prehistoric life of Europe